The Matița is a right tributary of the river Cricovul Sărat in Romania. It flows through the villages Zâmbroaia, Sărari, Curmătura, Matița, Podenii Noi, Sălcioara, Valea Dulce and Popești. It discharges into the Cricovul Sărat near Coșerele.

References

Rivers of Romania
Rivers of Prahova County